Zaurbek is the given name of:

Zaurbek Baysangurov (born 1985), Russian boxer and IBO and WBO light middleweight champion
Zaurbek Kambolov (born 1992), Russian footballer
Zaurbek Konov (born 1985), Russian footballer
Zaurbek Olisayev (born 1994), Russian footballer
Zaurbek Pliyev (born 1991), Russian footballer
Zaurbek Sokhiev (born 1986), Uzbekistani freestyle wrestler